The 1957 Canada Cup took place 24–27 October on the East Course at the Kasumigaseki Country Club in Kawagoe, Saitama, Japan. It was the fifth Canada Cup event, which became the World Cup in 1967. The tournament was a 72-hole stroke play team event with 30 teams. These were the same 29 teams that had competed in 1956 with the addition of Thailand. Each team consisted of two players from a country. The combined score of each team determined the team results. The Japanese team of Torakichi Nakamura and Koichi Ono won by nine strokes over the American team of Jimmy Demaret and Sam Snead. The individual competition was won by Torakichi Nakamura, seven shots ahead of Gary Player, Sam Snead and Dave Thomas.

Teams

Source

Scores
Team

Harry Bradshaw of Ireland withdrew after 36 holes due to nose bleeding. Fernando Silva of Portugal withdrew after 54 holes.

Source

International Trophy

Source

References

World Cup (men's golf)
Golf tournaments in Japan
Canada Cup
Canada Cup
Canada Cup